Kurtzina crossata is a species of sea snail, a marine gastropod mollusk in the family Mangeliidae.

Description
The length of the shell attains 6 mm, its diameter 3 mm.

Distribution
This marine species occurs from Georgia to Florida, USA

References

  Dall W. H. (1927). Small shells from dredgings off the southeast coast of the United states by the United States Fisheries Steamer "Albatross", in 1885 and 1886; Proceedings of the United States National Museum, 70(18): 1–134

External links
  Tucker, J.K. 2004 Catalog of recent and fossil turrids (Mollusca: Gastropoda). Zootaxa 682:1–1295.

crossata
Gastropods described in 1927